Simen Kristiansen Juklerød (born 18 May 1994) is a Norwegian football midfielder who plays for Vålerenga.

Club career
He started his youth career in IL Jutul, but joined Bærum SK at the age of ten. He progressed to the junior team and attended Dønski Upper Secondary School in Bærum's own training class. He broke into the senior team in 2013, and featured in the 2015 Norwegian First Division which ended with relegation. After the season, he was signed by first-tier club Vålerenga. He made his Norwegian Premier League debut in March 2016, playing one half against Sogndal. On 17 July 2018 Juklerød signed for Belgium side Royal Antwerp.

On 31 August 2022, Juklerød returned to Vålerenga and signed a contract for the term of 4.5 years.

Career statistics

Club

Honours
Royal Antwerp
Belgian Cup: 2019–20

References

1994 births
Living people
Sportspeople from Bærum
Norwegian footballers
Association football midfielders
Bærum SK players
Norwegian First Division players
Vålerenga Fotball players
Eliteserien players
Royal Antwerp F.C. players
K.R.C. Genk players
Belgian Pro League players
Norwegian expatriate footballers
Expatriate footballers in Belgium
Norwegian expatriate sportspeople in Belgium